The following is a list of professional wrestling attendance records in the United States. The list is dominated by the American professional wrestling promotion World Wrestling Entertainment which has controlled the industry in North America since 2002. As the World Wrestling Federation, it became the first national promotion in the U.S. during the 1980s wrestling boom. The National Wrestling Alliance and World Championship Wrestling were both main competitors to the WWF during the 1980s and 1990s, however, all of their events were surpassed by the WWE by the early 2000s.

According to this list, 17 events are from WWE's flagship WrestleMania pay-per-view (PPV) event, which since 2007's WrestleMania 23 has been held exclusively in stadiums that typically have a seating capacity of at least 70,000 people or more. Only three of the attendances listed are non-WWE events, with two WCW Monday Nitro episodes being the only house show events on the list. There are only two attendance records remaining from the "Territory-era" (1940s-1980s) and one from the "Pioneer-era" (1900s-1940s). All but eleven of the events have been held in the Southern United States, while three have been held on the East Coast (Massachusetts and New Jersey), four in the Midwest (Indiana, Michigan and Ohio),  two in the Southwest (Arizona) and two on the West Coast of the United States (California and Washington).

Events and attendances

Historical

See also
 List of WWE attendance records

Footnotes

References
General

Specific

External links
Supercards & Tournaments: United States Promotions at ProWrestlingHistory.com
Attendance records in the United States at Wrestlingdata.com

Professional wrestling attendances
Attendance records
Attendance records